Tazewell Avenue Historic District is a national historic district located at Richlands, Tazewell County, Virginia. The district encompasses 70 contributing buildings in a primarily residential section of the town of Richlands.  They were largely built between 1900 and 1960, and are modestly scaled brick and frame dwellings reflecting popular architectural styles including Queen Anne, Colonial Revival, and Bungalow.  Notable non-residential buildings include the former Pentecostal Holiness Church, former First Baptist Church, Barker Youth Center (1955), Nassif Building (c. 1945), and Masonic Hall and Jenkins Cleaners Building (c. 1930).

It was listed on the National Register of Historic Places in 2007.

References

Historic districts in Tazewell County, Virginia
Queen Anne architecture in Virginia
Colonial Revival architecture in Virginia
National Register of Historic Places in Tazewell County, Virginia
Historic districts on the National Register of Historic Places in Virginia